Jessica Anne Roberts (born 11 April 1999) is a British cyclist, who currently rides for UCI Women's Continental Team .

Career
Roberts won the British National Road Race Championships in 2018. Her sister, Amy Roberts is also a professional cyclist.

Roberts won her third national title at the 2023 British Cycling National Track Championships, she won the Team Pursuit for the third time, after previously winning the title in 2017 and 2019.

Major results

2016
 2nd  Points race, UCI Junior Track World Championships
 2nd Road race, National Junior Road Championships
 UEC European Junior Track Championships
3rd  Omnium
3rd  Team pursuit
 4th Time trial, European Junior Road Championships
 6th Overall Energiewacht Tour Juniors
2017
 Healthy Ageing Tour Juniors
1st Prologue & Stage 3
 2nd  Team pursuit, National Track Championships
 4th Overall EPZ Omloop van Borsele
 5th Piccolo Trofeo Alfredo Binda
2018
 1st  Road race, National Road Championships
 National Track Championships
1st  Team pursuit
2nd  Omnium
3rd  Points race
 UEC European Under–23 Track Championships
2nd  Madison (with Megan Barker)
2nd  Team pursuit
 6th Dwars door de Westhoek
2019
 European Games
1st  Madison (with Megan Barker)
2nd  Team pursuit
 1st  Omnium, UEC European Under–23 Track Championships
 1st  Team pursuit, National Track Championships
 Tour Series
1st Round 1 – Redditch
1st Round 2 – Motherwell
1st Round 3 – Aberdeen
 1st Wortegem–Petegem
 5th Overall Tour de Bretagne Féminin
1st Stages 4 & 5
2022
 2nd  Scratch race, UEC European Track Championships
 3rd  Scratch race, UCI Track World Championships

References

External links

1999 births
Living people
Welsh female cyclists
British cycling road race champions
Cyclists at the 2019 European Games
European Games medalists in cycling
European Games gold medalists for Great Britain
European Games silver medalists for Great Britain
Cyclists at the 2022 Commonwealth Games
Commonwealth Games competitors for Wales